Garvin Vastine Beauchamp (April 30, 1920 – December 2, 2002) was an American football coach.  He was the seventh head football coach at Abilene Christian University in Abilene, Texas, serving for six seasons, from 1950 to 1955, and compiling a record of 39–18–4.

Head coaching record

References

External links
 

1920 births
2002 deaths
Abilene Christian Wildcats football coaches
People from Post, Texas